Soestia is a monotypic genus of tunicates belonging to the family Salpidae. The only species is Soestia zonaria.

The species has cosmopolitan distribution.

References

Tunicates